Coopersville is a city located in north central Ottawa County in the U.S. state of Michigan.  The population was 4,828 at the 2020 census.  It is primarily a farming community.

The city is located within Polkton Township, though it is administratively autonomous. It lies just north of Interstate 96 along the eastern township boundary, adjacent to Wright Township on the east. There are two exits on I-96, one at the southeast corner of the city and the other at the southwest corner.

Coopersville served as the primary filming location for the 2012 football film Touchback.

Geography
Over 50% of the land within the city limits is committed to agriculture.

Demographics

2020 census
As of the census of 2020, there were 4,828 people, 1,755 households, and 1,568  families living in the city. The population density was 1003.74/sq mi. There were 1813 housing units. The racial makeup of the city was 89.02% White, 1.36% African American, 0.43% Native American, 0.52% Asian, 2.26% from other races, and 6.32% from two or more races. Hispanic or Latino of any race were 5.47% of the population.

There were 1,755 households, of which 30.4% had children under the age of 18 living with them, 38.25% were married couples living together, 10.14% had a female householder with no husband present, 2.2% had a male householder with no wife present. The average family size was 3.38.

The median age in the city was 30.5 years. 30.4% of residents were under the age of 18, and 12.1% were 65 years of age or older.

2010 census
As of the census of 2010, there were 4,275 people, 1,604 households, and 1,103 families living in the city. The racial makeup of the city was 95.5% White, 0.5% African American, 0.6% Native American, 0.7% Asian, 1.0% from other races, and 1.6% from two or more races. Hispanic or Latino of any race were 3.7% of the population.

There were 1,604 households, of which 39.8% had children under the age of 18 living with them, 51.2% were married couples living together, 13.3% had a female householder with no husband present, 4.2% had a male householder with no wife present, and 31.2% were non-families. 25.7% of all households were made up of individuals, and 12.2% had someone living alone who was 65 years of age or older. The average household size was 2.66 and the average family size was 3.23.

The median age in the city was 32.8 years. 29.3% of residents were under the age of 18; 9.8% were between the ages of 18 and 24; 27.8% were from 25 to 44; 22% were from 45 to 64; and 11.2% were 65 years of age or older. The gender makeup of the city was 48.3% male and 51.7% female.

2000 census
As of the census of 2000, there were 3,910 people, 1,420 households, and 1,036 families living in the city. The racial makeup of the city was 96.37% White, 0.20% African American, 0.64% Native American, 0.69% Asian, 1.28% from other races, and 0.82% from two or more races. Hispanic or Latino of any race were 2.71% of the population.

There were 1,420 households, out of which 39.6% had children under the age of 18 living with them, 57.9% were married couples living together, 11.7% had a female householder with no husband present, and 27.0% were non-families. 22.6% of all households were made up of individuals, and 8.9% had someone living alone who was 65 years of age or older.  The average household size was 2.74 and the average family size was 3.21.

In the city, the population was spread out, with 30.2% under the age of 18, 10.9% from 18 to 24, 30.5% from 25 to 44, 18.3% from 45 to 64, and 10.1% who were 65 years of age or older.  The median age was 31 years. For every 100 females, there were 93.9 males.  For every 100 females age 18 and over, there were 86.2 males.

The median income for a household in the city was $48,875, and the median income for a family was $55,226. Males had a median income of $39,725 versus $22,464 for females. The per capita income for the city was $19,241.  About 4.5% of families and 7.7% of the population were below the poverty line, including 5.4% of those under age 18 and 17.5% of those age 65 or over.

Education

Primary and secondary schools
Coopersville Public Schools
Coopersville High School
Coopersville Middle School
South Elementary
East Elementary
West Early Childhood Center

Transportation
Coopersville and Marne Railway

Major highways

Notable people 
Butch Miller, a NASCAR driver
Del Shannon, 1960s rock singer and guitarist
Tim Steele, an ARCA racer

References

External links
City of Coopersville
Coopersville Area Chamber of Commerce
Coopersville Area Public Schools

Cities in Ottawa County, Michigan
1871 establishments in Michigan
Populated places established in 1871